Borommaracha or Borom Racha ("Supreme King"), or the extended version Borommarachathirat or Borom Rachathirat ("Supreme King of High kings"), was a Thai royal title, and may refer to:

 Borommarachathirat I (died 1388), third king of Ayutthaya Kingdom
 Borommarachathirat II (died 1448), king of Ayutthaya
 Borommarachathirat III (died 1491), king of Ayutthaya from 1488 to 1491
 Borommarachathirat IV (died 1533), short-reigning king of Ayutthaya from 1529 to 1533
 Taksin (1734–1782), known in some documents as Borommarachathirat IV

See also
 Barom Reachea (disambiguation), Khmer equivalent title

Thai royal titles